The Man with Two Faces is an American drama film directed by Archie Mayo, and starring Edward G. Robinson and Mary Astor. The supporting cast features Ricardo Cortez, Louis Calhern, Mae Clarke, and David Landau. The story was adapted by Tom Reed and Niven Busch from the play The Dark Tower by George S. Kaufman and Alexander Woollcott.

The Man with Two Faces was actress Margaret Dale's last film and her only talkie. She and Anton Stengel are the only two actors from the Broadway play to appear in the film. In 2010, this film became available on DVD from the Warner Archive Collection.

Plot
Jessica Wells (Mary Astor) is a beautiful and talented actress, returning to the stage after a three-year absence. Although her triumphal return seems certain, family and friends are shocked when Vance (Louis Calhern), her long-lost husband with a criminal past, shows up at the family home. He immediately exerts his influence on the vivacious Jessica, and she becomes a sleepwalking automaton blindly obeying orders.

The avaricious and opportunistic Vance (who appears carrying pet mice in a cage) has heard that his wife holds half the rights to the play in which she will be featured, a prospective hit, but a certain disaster in her somnambulist state.

Stage star Damon Wells (Edward G. Robinson) lends theatrical prestige to his sister's comeback while helping to reclaim her talent as her acting coach. He and Jessica's manager (Ricardo Cortez) realize that the verminous Vance must be dealt with at once, so Damon begins an elaborate ruse, presenting himself to the schemer as the bearded French theatrical producer Jules Chautard.

Vance is lured to a hotel room by Jules/Damon, thinking that he will be paid handsomely for Jessica's half-interest in the play, but is instead drugged and then stabbed to death. Damon cannily covers his tracks in the murder, but he accidentally leaves a few theatrical mustache-whiskers when closing a Gideon Bible.

Police Sergeant William Curtis cracks the case when he connects the artificial hair to the art of an actor and confronts Damon in his dressing room. The detective, however, is aware of the suspicious past of the victim and not unsympathetic to the actor.  Wells is left with the suggestion that he can perhaps act his way out of the rap.

Cast
(in credits order)
 Edward G. Robinson as Damon Wells / Jules Chautard
 Mary Astor as Jessica Wells
 Ricardo Cortez as Producer Ben Weston
 Mae Clarke as Daphne Flowers
 Louis Calhern as Stanley Vance
 Arthur Byron as Dr. Kendall
 John Eldredge as Horace "Barry" Jones
 David Landau as Sergeant William Curtis
 Emily Fitzroy as Hattie, Martha's Housekeeper
 Henry O'Neill as Inspector Crane
 Anton Stengel as Stage Manager
 Arthur Aylesworth as Morgue Keeper
 Margaret Dale as Aunt Martha Temple
 Virginia Sale as Peabody, Weston's Secretary

References

External links
 
 
 
 
 lobby poster
 the film reviewed extensively during a birthday tribute to Mary Astor, 2013

1934 films
1934 crime drama films
American crime drama films
American black-and-white films
Films about actors
American films based on plays
Films directed by Archie Mayo
Warner Bros. films
1930s English-language films
1930s American films
Films scored by Bernhard Kaun